Palana Airport  is an airport in Koryak Okrug, Russia located 4 km west of Palana. It services small transports.

Airlines and destinations

Incidents and accidents

On 12 September 2012, an An-28 operated by Petropavlovsk-Kamchatsky Air Enterprise as Flight 251 crashed whilst on a domestic flight from Petropavlovsk-Kamchatsky to Palana Airport, killing ten of the fourteen people on board.
On July 6, 2021, an An-26 of Petropavlovsk-Kamchatsky Air Enterprise, also operating as Flight 251, crashed on approach to Palana Airport into a steep coastal cliff. Wreckage has been found at the cliff site, and floating offshore. There were no survivors among the aircraft's 28 occupants.

References

External links
Official website (in Russian)

Airports built in the Soviet Union
Airports in Kamchatka Krai